Saakadze is a Georgian surname. Notable people with the surname include:
Tarkhan-Mouravi, a Georgian noble family
Bijan Beg Saakadze, Georgian courtier
Giorgi Saakadze, Georgian military commander
Rostom Saakadze, Georgian military commander

Georgian-language surnames